Middlewich Town Football Club is a football club based in the Cheshire town of Middlewich.

History
Middlewich has had a town football club since at least 1912, with Middlewich Athletic playing at Seddon Street since 1912. Middlewich Athletic were mid-Cheshire league champions five times between 1952 and 1975. In 1998 Middlewich Town was formed by combining Middlewich Athletic with the Middlewich Town Youth teams, so that the club now has junior squads ranging from under 8s to under 16s, a reserve team and a first XI. Since the name change Middlewich have been runners up in the mid-Cheshire league three times, and won the league once.

Honours
Mid-Cheshire League/Cheshire League Division One
Champions 1961–62, 1964–65, 1971–72, 1972–73, 1974–75, 2003–04, 2005–06, 2006–07
Runners-up 1955–56, 1965–66, 1973–74, 1999–2000, 2002–03, 2004–05, 2007–08, 2008–09
Mid-Cheshire League Division Two
Runners-up 1992–93

Records
FA Amateur Cup
Second Round 1973–74
FA Trophy
First Qualifying Round 1976–77, 1977–78, 1978–79
FA Vase
Fifth Round 1974–75, 1980–81

Former players
1. Players that have played/managed in the Football League or any foreign equivalent to this level (i.e. fully professional league).
2. Players with full international caps.
3. Players that hold a club record or have captained the club.
 Hughie Reed

References

External links

Football clubs in Cheshire
Middlewich
North West Counties Football League clubs
Association football clubs established in 1998
1998 establishments in England
Football clubs in England
Cheshire Association Football League
Cheshire County League clubs